The Hawk Relaxes is an album by saxophonist Coleman Hawkins which was recorded in 1961 and released on the Moodsville label.

Reception

Allmusic awarded the album 4½ stars stating "This quintet -- as unique as any Hawkins ever fronted -- speaks to his open mindedness, but more so to his innate ability in adapting musicians to his situational hitting. The Hawk Relaxes is one of his best latter period efforts".

Track listing 
 "I'll Never Be The Same" (Gus Kahn, Matty Malneck, Frank Signorelli) - 6:11
 "When Day Is Done" (Buddy DeSylva, Robert Katscher}) - 4:28
 "Under a Blanket of Blue" (Jerry Livingston, Al J. Neiburg, Marty Symes) - 4:39
 "More Than You Know" (Edward Eliscu, Billy Rose, Vincent Youmans) - 4:12
 "Moonglow" (Eddie DeLange, Will Hudson, Irving Mills) - 5:59
 "Just a Gigolo" (Julius Brammer, Irving Caesar, Leonello Casucci) - 5:04
 "Speak Low" (Ogden Nash, Kurt Weill) - 6:44

Personnel 
Coleman Hawkins - tenor saxophone
Ronnell Bright - piano
Kenny Burrell - guitar
Ron Carter - bass
Andrew Cyrille - drums

References 

Coleman Hawkins albums
1961 albums
Moodsville Records albums
Albums recorded at Van Gelder Studio
Albums produced by Esmond Edwards